This is a List of Odisha first-class cricket records, with each list containing the top five performances in the category.

Currently active players are bolded.

Team records

Highest innings totals

Lowest innings totals

Largest margin of innings victory

Largest margin of runs victory

Batting records

Highest individual scores

Bowling records

Best innings bowling

Best match bowling

Hat-Trick

See also

 Odisha cricket team
 List of Odisha List A cricket records

Notes

All lists are referenced to CricketArchive.

Cricket in Odisha
Lists of Indian cricket records and statistics